= Swedish Association of Professional Translators =

The Swedish Association of Professional Translators (Swedish: Sveriges facköversättarförening, SFÖ) is an industry organisation for professional translators. SFÖ is Sweden's largest translator organisation.

Founded in 1990, SFÖ has close to 1,000 members as of 2019. The association is focused on promoting the exchange of experience and expertise between professional translators, promoting the financial and legal interests of its members and monitoring and informing about developments within the field. SFÖ also works to raise the profile of the profession and build networks between professional translators and clients, including translation agencies. The association's online-database of translators allows translation agencies and direct clients to search for their desired language combination and/or subject area to find appropriate translators.

Much of the association's work is through internal groups, such as the Ethics Committee, the Mentor Group, the Professional Development Group and the individual language groups.

SFÖ regularly organises courses, conferences and webinaires. Its largest annual event is its annual conference. In 2020, the association will be celebrating its 30th anniversary with a jubileum conference in Umeå, Sweden. The conference is held each year in a different part of the country. The association also publishes a member magazine, Facköversättaren, with four issues annually.

Since 2016, SFÖ has been a co-organiser of the biannual conference Scandinavian Language Associations’ Meeting (SLAM!) together with sister organisations the Federation of Authorised Translators in Sweden (FAT), the Norwegian Association of Professional Translators (NORFAG), the Finnish Association of Translators and Interpreters (FÖTF), the Association of Government Authorized Translators in Norway (STF) and Rättstolkarna, a Swedish legal interpreter organisation.
